Natalya Asanova (Cyrillic: Наталья Асанова; born 29 November 1989 in Andijan Region) is an Uzbekistani athlete specialising in the 400 metres hurdles. She represented her country at the 2012 Summer Olympics and 2016 Summer Olympics without qualifying for the final.

Her personal best in the event is 56.13, set in Tashkent in 2012.

International competitions

References

1989 births
Living people
People from Andijan Region
Uzbekistani female hurdlers
Olympic athletes of Uzbekistan
Athletes (track and field) at the 2012 Summer Olympics
Athletes (track and field) at the 2016 Summer Olympics
Asian Games competitors for Uzbekistan
Athletes (track and field) at the 2010 Asian Games
Athletes (track and field) at the 2014 Asian Games
21st-century Uzbekistani women